The following comprises a list of sites of interest (attractions) in Philadelphia and its immediate environs:

Historic sites and national parks

 American Philosophical Society Hall
 Belmont Mansion
 Benjamin Franklin National Memorial
 Betsy Ross House
 Carpenters' Hall
 Colonial Germantown Historic District
 Congress Hall
 Ebenezer Maxwell House
 Edgar Allan Poe National Historic Site
 Elfreth's Alley
 Fairmount Water Works
 First Bank of the United States
 Fort Mifflin
 Franklin Court
 Friends Hospital
 Founder's Hall, Girard College
 Gloria Dei (Old Swedes') Church
 Independence Hall
 Independence National Historical Park
 Laurel Hill Cemetery
 Liberty Bell
 Memorial Hall
 Merchants' Exchange
 National Mechanics
 New Market, and the surrounding Head House Square Historic District
 Pennsylvania Hospital
 Philadelphia City Hall
 Philadelphia Naval Asylum
 Second Bank of the United States
 Thaddeus Kosciuszko National Memorial
 University of Pennsylvania central campus

Museums

Art
 Barnes Foundation
 Institute of Contemporary Art, Philadelphia
 La Salle University Art Museum
 Pennsylvania Academy of the Fine Arts
 Philadelphia Museum of Art
 Perelman Building
 Rodin Museum
 University of Pennsylvania Museum of Archaeology and Anthropology
 Woodmere Art Museum

Science
 Academy of Natural Sciences
 Franklin Institute
 Insectarium
 Mütter Museum
 Science History Institute 
 Wagner Free Institute of Science

History
 African American Museum in Philadelphia
 American Swedish Historical Museum
 Civil War Museum of Philadelphia
 Elfreth's Alley
 Grand Army of the Republic Civil War Museum and Library
 Historical Society of Frankford
 Historical Society of Pennsylvania
 Museum of the American Revolution
 National Constitution Center
 National Liberty Museum
 National Museum of American Jewish History
 Philadelphia History Museum

Historic houses

 Belmont Mansion
 Betsy Ross House
 Bishop White House
 Cliveden
 Dolley Todd House
 Ebenezer Maxwell Mansion
 Elfreth's Alley Museum
 Germantown White House
 Glen Foerd on the Delaware
 Grumblethorpe
 Hill-Keith-Physick House
 Historic RittenhouseTown
 Historic Strawberry Mansion
 John Johnson House
 Lemon Hill
 Marian Anderson Museum and Birthplace
 Mount Pleasant
 Powel House
 Ryerss Museum and Library
 Stenton
 Sweetbriar
 Upsala
 Woodford
 Wyck House

Other
 Athenaeum of Philadelphia
 Concord School House
 Eastern State Penitentiary
 The Fabric Workshop and Museum
 Free Library of Philadelphia
 Library Company of Philadelphia
 Living Loft Puppet Museum
 Mario Lanza Museum
 Masonic Library and Museum of Pennsylvania
 Mummers Museum
 National Shrine of Saint John Neumann
 Philadelphia Doll Museum
 Please Touch Museum
 Polish American Cultural Center Museum
 Romanian Folk Art Museum
 Rosenbach Museum & Library
 SEPTA Museum
 Shofuso Japanese House and Garden
 Simeone Foundation Automotive Museum
 USS Becuna (SS-319)
 USS Olympia (C-6)

Galleries
 Arthur Ross Gallery at the University of Pennsylvania
 Center for Art in Wood
 The Design Center of Philadelphia University
 Drexel University Collection
 Fleisher Art Memorial
 The Galleries at Moore College
 Painted Bride Art Center
 Paradigm Gallery and Studio
 Philadelphia Art Alliance
 Philadelphia's Magic Gardens
 The Print Center
 Tyler School of Art

Outdoors

Animal life institutions
 Adventure Aquarium (in Camden, New Jersey)
 John Heinz National Wildlife Refuge at Tinicum
 Philadelphia Zoo
 The Schuylkill Center

Horticultural institutions
 Awbury Arboretum
 Bartram's Garden
 Centennial Arboretum
 The Horticulture Center
 Marconi Plaza
 Morris Arboretum

Parks and squares

 Clark Park
 Fairmount Park
 Franklin Square
 Logan Circle
 LOVE Park
 Penn's Landing
 Rittenhouse Square
 Washington Square and Tomb of the Unknown Soldier

Performing arts centers

Professional
 Academy of Music - opera, ballet
 Forrest Theatre - plays, musicals
 Franklin Music Hall - popular music
 Kimmel Center for the Performing Arts - classical music
 Mann Center for the Performing Arts - summer venue, classical and popular music
 Miller Theater - Broadway and a variety of performance arts theater
 Plays and Players Theatre - plays, musicals
 Prince Music Theater - various
 Susquehanna Bank Center in Camden, New Jersey - popular music
 Suzanne Roberts Theatre - plays, musicals
 The TLA (formerly the Theater of the Living Arts) - popular music
 Tower Theater in Upper Darby - popular music
 Trocadero Theatre - popular musical acts
 Walnut Street Theatre - plays, musicals
 Wilma Theater - plays, musicals

Educational
 Annenberg Center for the Performing Arts, University of Pennsylvania - various
 Arts Bank, University of the Arts - dance, student performances
 Curtis Opera Studio, Curtis Institute of Music - opera
 Field Concert Hall, Curtis Institute of Music - classical music
 Helen Corning Warden Theater, Academy of Vocal Arts - opera
 Irvine Auditorium, University of Pennsylvania - features a pipe organ
 Main Auditorium, Drexel University - site of the 2007 Democratic debate; features a pipe organ
 Mandell Theater, Drexel University 
 Miller Theater, University of the Arts - various

Religious buildings

 Arch Street Friends Meeting House
 Beth Sholom Synagogue in Elkins Park
 Cathedral Basilica of Saints Peter and Paul
 Christ Church
 Church of the Advocate
 Church of St. James the Less
 Congregation Mikveh Israel
 Gloria Dei (Old Swedes') Church
 Mikveh Israel Synagogue
 Mother Bethel A.M.E. Church
 National Shrine of Saint John Neumann
 Race Street Friends Meetinghouse
 Saint Clement's Church
 St. Mark's Episcopal Church
 St. Peter's Church

Shopping areas

 Chinatown
 Fashion District Philadelphia - shopping mall in Center City
 Italian Market - open produce and meat market with many specialty shops
 Jewelers' Row - two densely packed blocks of jewelers and related shops
 Philadelphia Mills - a large outlet and discount shopping mall in the Far Northeast section
 Reading Terminal Market - large enclosed produce, meat and prepared food market featuring some Pennsylvania Dutch merchants and others
 The Shops at Liberty Place - upscale shopping mall inside the skyscraper complex known as Liberty Place
 South Street - many trendy and counterculture shops between Front and 10th Streets
 Walnut Street - many expensive shops between Broad and 20th Streets and the surrounding area
 Wanamaker's (now Macy's) - defined the department store and remains a landmark; features the Wanamaker Organ

Sports venues

 at 235 South 33rd Street

Professional
 2300 Arena - boxing, wrestling, MMA
 Citizens Bank Park - Philadelphia Phillies
 Lincoln Financial Field - Philadelphia Eagles, Temple Owls football
 Wells Fargo Center - Philadelphia Flyers, Philadelphia 76ers, and Philadelphia Wings

Collegiate
 Boathouse Row - collegiate and amateur rowing
 Daskalakis Athletic Center - Drexel University
 Franklin Field - University of Pennsylvania
 Hagan Arena - Saint Joseph's University
 Hayman Center - LaSalle University
 Liacouras Center - Temple University
 McCarthy Stadium - LaSalle University
 The Palestra - University of Pennsylvania
 Villanova Stadium in Villanova - Villanova University

Eateries

 Amada Restaurant -  owned by Jose Garces, Philadelphia's newest Iron Chef
 The Fountain Restaurant - the Four Season Hotel, rated #1 in the city by Zagat Survey
 Geno's Steaks -  of the "Geno's vs. Pat's" debate
 McGillin's Olde Ale House - the oldest continuously operational tavern in Philadelphia
 Morimoto - the original Iron Chef's restaurant
 Moshulu - a converted 1904 sailing ship.
 Pat's King of Steaks - created the cheesesteak

Railroad

 30th Street Station
 Reading Terminal
 Suburban Station

Maritime

 Gazela Primeiro
 Independence Seaport Museum
 Philadelphia Naval Shipyard
 USS New Jersey (BB-62) (in Camden, New Jersey)
 SS United States

Miscellaneous
 Toynbee tiles

See also

 Architecture of Philadelphia
 Culture of Philadelphia
 List of church buildings in Philadelphia
 List of museums in Pennsylvania
 List of National Historic Landmarks in Pennsylvania
 List of National Historic Landmarks in Philadelphia
 List of public art in Philadelphia
 List of National Register of Historic Places in Philadelphia
 Philadelphia Register of Historic Places

References

Visit Philadelphia - official site

 
 
Sites of interest
Philadelphia